GlowHost.com, LLC. is a privately held web hosting company headquartered in the United States of America and is currently registered in the State of Florida providing shared, reseller, virtual private server, and dedicated web hosting

Company history
The company was founded in Crested Butte, Colorado by Matt Lundstrom in 2002. GlowHost is a Registered Trademark registered with the United States Patent and Trademark Office. This trademark was first used in commerce on April 1, 2002, later on April 16, 2009 an application for the trademark was submitted to the USPTO which was published for opposition on September 1, 2009. Finally the Trademark was registered on November 17, 2009. GlowHost is accredited with the Better Business Bureau, and had an A+ rating as of October 21, 2015.

Press
GlowHost introduces Cloud hosting technology for small and medium-sized business, geared to replace dedicated servers.

Webhostdir.com interviewed founder and President Matt Lundstrom in 2011. The article is available on their site.

In 2010 GlowHost sponsored The Annual Web Hosting Awards at hostreview.com and placed 3rd for the best VPS Hosting service.

According to a press release from April 15, 2009, GlowHost acquired DataCities.com, a rival web hosting company.

Awards and Achievements
GlowHost has received numerous awards for its web hosting services. An interesting point is that the company has received an award outside of the web hosting industry. In 2010 GlowHost wrote a software firewall to combat forum Spam for a popular 3rd Party forum software called vBulletin. Known as Spam-O-Matic Spam Firewall, this software was download by over 2500 users in the first couple of months that it was available in the public domain. The software was awarded "Mod of the Month" by vBulletin.org.

References

External links

 VPS Hosting

Web hosting
Companies established in 2002
Companies based in Florida
2002 establishments in Florida